Veisjärv is a lake of Estonia located on the borders of Mulgi Parish and Viljandi Parish in Viljandi County next to the village of Veisjärve. The Õhne river flows into Veisjärv.

See also
List of lakes of Estonia

Lakes of Estonia
Viljandi Parish
Mulgi Parish
Lakes of Viljandi County